This is a list of notable Catholic churches and cathedrals in the United States.

In the United States, there are more than 20,000 catholic church buildings. Among these numerous Catholic churches and cathedrals are notable.  Notable ones include any that are listed on the National Register of Historic Places or on state and local historic registers.

There are 193 current Catholic cathedrals in the U.S., listed at List of the Catholic cathedrals of the United States. Another 74 basilicas—some are also cathedrals—are notable as well (See List of basilicas). The following list, by state, is intended to includes all these cathedrals plus other active churches and notable former cathedrals and churches.

These include:

(by state then city or town)

Alabama

Alaska

Arizona

Arkansas

California

Colorado

Connecticut

Delaware

District of Columbia

Florida

Georgia

Hawaii

Idaho

Illinois

Indiana

Iowa

Kansas

Kentucky

Louisiana

Maine

Maryland

Massachusetts

Michigan

Minnesota

Mississippi

Missouri

Montana

Nebraska

Nevada

New Hampshire

New Jersey

New Mexico

New York

New York City

North Carolina

North Dakota

Ohio

Oklahoma

Oregon

Pennsylvania

Rhode Island

South Carolina

South Dakota

Tennessee

Texas

Utah

Vermont

Virginia

Washington

West Virginia

Wisconsin

Wyoming

Related, other
NRHP-listed notable Catholic church-related properties, for which the corresponding churches are likely notable, or for which they should be added to List of Catholic schools, include:

See also
 List of Catholic cathedrals in the United States
 List of parishes in Louisiana
 List of parishes in the Roman Catholic Diocese of Albany
 List of parishes in the Roman Catholic Diocese of Fresno
 List of Roman Catholic churches in the Archdiocese of Atlanta
 List of Roman Catholic churches in the Diocese of Charleston
 List of parishes of the Roman Catholic Diocese of Honolulu
 List of churches in the Roman Catholic Archdiocese of New York
 Catholic churches in Vermont

References

Catholic
United States